I'll Never Forget That Night is a 1949 German comedy film directed by Johannes Meyer and starring Gustav Fröhlich, Winnie Markus and Paul Henckels. It was shot at the Bendestorf Studios near Hamburg. The film's sets were designed by the art director Erich Grave.

Cast
 Gustav Fröhlich as Dr. Paul Schröter
 Winnie Markus as Eva Surén
 Paul Henckels as Dr. Max Schröter
 Hardy Krüger as Eugen Schröter
 Jester Naefe as Yvonne Rödern
 Ernst Waldow as Camillo Brause
 Hans Schwarz Jr. as Franz Bauer
 Inge Landgut as Lucie
 Charlotte Witthauer as Josefa Bauer
 Albert Florath as Hendrick Surén
 Willi Schaeffers as Hugo Morall
 Hans Richter as Dick Jaefferson
 Elise Aulinger as Therese
 Ludwig Dose as Attila Kornewitz
 Carl Voscherau as Gemeindevorsteher Kußmaul
 Hans Harloff
 Herbert A.E. Böhme as Polizist
 Detlev Lais as Sänger

References

Bibliography
 Bock, Hans-Michael & Bergfelder, Tim. The Concise Cinegraph: Encyclopaedia of German Cinema. Berghahn Books, 2009.

External links 
 

1949 films
1949 comedy films
German comedy films
1940s German-language films
Films directed by Johannes Meyer
Bavaria Film films
German black-and-white films
1940s German films